Cycling at the 2012 Summer Paralympics consisted of 50 events in two main disciplines, track cycling and road cycling. Track cycling was held in London Velopark from 30 August to 2 September, and road cycling took place at Brands Hatch from September 5 to September 8.

Classification

Cyclists are given a classification depending on the type and extent of their disability. The classification system allows cyclists to compete against others with a similar level of function. The class number indicates the severity of impairment with "1" being most impaired.

Cycling classes are:
B: Blind and visually impaired cyclists use a Tandem bicycle with a sighted pilot on the front - both athletes are awarded medals
H 1–4: Cyclists with an impairment that affects their legs use a handcycle
T 1–2: Cyclists with an impairment that affects their balance use a tricycle
C 1-5: Cyclists with an impairment that affects their legs, arms and/or trunk but are capable of using a standard bicycle

Events
For each of the events below, medals are contested for one or more of the above classifications.

Road cycling

Men's individual road race
• B • H1 • H2
• H3 • H4 • C1-3
• C4-5
Men's individual time trial
• B • H1 • H2 • H3 
• H4 • C1 • C2
• C3 • C4 • C5

Women's individual road race
• B • H1-3 • H4
• C1-3 • C4-5
Women's individual time trial
• B • H1-2 • H3
• H4 • C1-3 • C4
• C5

Mixed individual road race
• T1-2
Mixed individual time trial
• T1-2
Mixed team relay
• H1-4

Track cycling

Men's 1 km time trial
• B • C1-3 • C4-5
Men's individual pursuit
• B • C1 • C2
• C3 • C4 • C5
Men's individual sprint
• B

Women's 500m time trial
• C1-3 • C4-5
Women's 1 km time trial
• B
Women's individual pursuit
• B • C1-3 • C4
• C5
Mixed team sprint
• C1-5

Participating nations
223 cyclists from 48 nations including 37 guides from 20 selected nations competed. 

 + 1 pilot
 + 3 pilots

 + 1 pilot

 + 3 pilots

 + 1 pilot
 + 3 pilots
 + 1 pilot

 + 4 pilots
 + 2 pilots

 + 3 pilots

 + 1 pilot
 + 1 pilot

 + 1 pilot
 + 3 pilots
 + 1 pilot

 + 1 pilot

 + 1 pilot
 + 1 pilot

 + 4 pilots

 + 1 pilot

Medal summary

Medal table

Road cycling

Men's events

Women's events

Mixed events

Track cycling

Men's events

Women's events

Mixed events

See also
Cycling at the 2012 Summer Olympics

References

External links
Official site of the 2012 Summer Paralympics 
IPC
UCI:Union Cycliste Internationale
Results Book – Road
Results Book – Track

 
2012
2012 Summer Paralympics events
Paralympics
Paralympics
2012 in cycle racing
International cycle races hosted by the United Kingdom